Razi Abedi is a Pakistani author, activist and scholar.

Life 

He received an M.A. in English from University of the Punjab. In 1968, he went to England for higher studies and attained M.A. and Tripos from Cambridge University in 1969. He is particularly interested in Urdu literature in the context of third-world literature and the literature now being produced in the West. He has also written extensively about education and its socio-cultural implications. He has lectured on topics related to Romanticism.

Works 
 The Tragic Vision
 Search For Medium
 Educational Chaos
 Lays and Lyrics
 Man of the Streets
 Teesri Dunya Ka Adab (Urdu)
 Acchut Logon Ka Adab (Urdu)
 Maghribi Drama Aur Jadeed Adabi Tehrikain (Urdu)
 Teen Novel Nigar (Urdu)
 Kuch Ghazlain Kuch Nazmain (Urdu Poetry)
 Bazar ki Raunaq (Urdu)
 Jeevan Dhara Author Dr. Taha Hussain (Translation)
 Aik Naujawan Shair kay Naam Khatoot Author: Rilke (Translation)
 Anar Kay Sai Author: Tariq Ali (Translation)

References

External links 
 
 
 http://mashalbooks.org

1933 births
Living people
Alumni of the University of Cambridge
Muhajir people
Pakistani expatriates in the United Kingdom
Pakistani scholars
Pakistani writers
People from Sonipat